Wolffsohn's viscacha (Lagidium wolffsohni) is a rare species of rodent in the family Chinchillidae. This species occurs in southwestern Argentina and adjacent Chile. It is found in rocky outcrops in mountainous areas.

References

External links
http://eol.org/pages/326929/details

Chinchillidae
Mammals of Patagonia
Mammals of Argentina
Mammals of Chile
Mammals described in 1907
Taxa named by Oldfield Thomas
Taxonomy articles created by Polbot